Oregon Pacific Railroad  is a short-line railroad operating two disconnected routes: one in southeast Portland, Oregon, and another incorporating portions of the former Southern Pacific Molalla Branch between Canby and Liberal, Oregon.

History 
Dick Samuels, a local businessman owning a scrap steel business, purchased the rights to salvage the remnants of the Portland Traction Company's remaining freight railroad between Portland and Boring. The Portland Terminal Railroad was once an interurban railroad but had been owned 50/50 by the Southern Pacific and Union Pacific railroads since the mid-1950s to handle the remaining freight business along the road.  By the mid-1980s the remaining freight business east of Milwaukie was virtually gone as local land uses shifted from farming and industrial to housing. Some of the last shipments along the railroad were TriMet's first light rail cars, delivered to its Ruby Junction shops, which were located on a former Portland Traction Company branch line that had been abandoned years before.

Despite the loss of most business, there was still a handful of shippers that continued to reliably ship by train from an industrial park located in the northern part of Milwaukie along the Portland city boundary. Mr. Samuels purchased the approximately five miles of track from Portland to Milwaukie and formed the East Portland Traction Company to continue rail service to those customers. The customers included Americold, Darigold, and the Oregon Liquor Control Commission.

In 1993, the East Portland Traction Company began running an excursion train known as Samtrak (named after the owner as well as a play on Amtrak, the national passenger railroad company) from the Oregon Museum of Science and Industry  (OMSI) to Portland's Sellwood neighborhood. The train itself was modest with a small General Electric 45-ton locomotive, an open-air coach made from an old flatcar and a converted former logging railroad caboose. Although the excursion trains stopped running in 2001, the Oregon Pacific Railroad continues to host special excursions featuring the popular Holiday Express trains using Southern Pacific 4449 and Spokane, Portland & Seattle 700 restored steam locomotives, as well as several speeder (motorcar) runs every year.

Also in 1993, the Oregon Pacific leased the Southern Pacific's Molalla Branch connecting Canby with Molalla. This approximately  route serves several shippers within Canby as well as in the small community of Liberal. However, several miles of track from Liberal into Molalla were abandoned after the loss of all shippers in the town. This operation was originally known as the Molalla Western Railway.

In 1996, both railroads were officially merged into the Oregon Pacific Railroad with the East Portland Traction Company becoming the East Portland Division and the Molalla Western Railway becoming the Molalla Branch Division.

, the Oregon Pacific continues to operate its two railroads to provide freight service to its shippers. It also allows organizations or private individuals to charter a train, has operated trains featured in at least one movie and several television shows, and operates the popular Christmas time Holiday Express trains.

Roster

See also 

  Springwater Corridor Trail: a rails-to-trails conversion of the majority of Portland Traction Company's track to Boring

References

External links 
 Oregon Pacific Railroad
 Molalla Western Railway Company

Oregon railroads
Railway companies established in 1997
1997 establishments in Oregon